Orders, decorations, and medals of Serbian Orthodox Church represents a system of decorations awarded by Holy Synod of Bishops of Serbian Orthodox Church as a general church or dioceses as their own decorations. In the Constitution of the Serbian Orthodox Church (Article 55, item 10) from 1957 provides that church decorations and decorations are awarded by Serbian Patriarch, according to the decree prescribed by Holy Synod of Bishops. Proposals for the decoration of clergy are given by diocesan archbishops (archbishop, metropolitans, bishops), and the decision is made by Holy Synod of Bishops. Also, it is envisaged that Archbishops may decorate persons themselves, with those decorations whose award is within their competence, i.e. with diocesan decorations Constitution of the Serbian Orthodox Church, Article 108, item 12).

History of the decorations 
Serbian Orthodox Church did not award special decorations before 1945. With the coming to power of the communism in Yugoslavia, that is, the fall of the monarchy and the introduction of complete separation of state and church, there was a need for the introduction of special church recognitions in the form of decorations.

The first decoration Serbian Orthodox Church appeared 1946, on the occasion of the 600th anniversary of the rise of the Serbian church from the archbishopric to the patriarchate, or the enthronement of the first Serbian Patriarch Joanikije. The "Order of the Holy Patriarch Ioannicius" was awarded only to dioceses in North America.

The Bishop of Raška and Prizren Artemije Radosavljević established the first modern church decoration in the country, and that was the Medal of Mother Jugović, which was awarded to mothers with several children.

Since 1985 Holy Synod of Bishops Serbian Orthodox Church awards Order of Saint Sava, which was originally established as a state decoration, by decree king Milan Obrenović from 23 January 1883 and was awarded until 1945 when he continued to award it to the elder royal family Karađorđević as a dynastic decoration, so that today there are two orders of St. Sava: church and royal.

General church decorations by importance 

 Order of Saint Sava
Order of the Holy King Milutin – Awarded for patronage and charity.
 Order of Saint Peter of Cetinje – Awarded for missionary work, peacemaking, evangelization and personal feat.
Order of the Holy Stefan Lazarević – Awarded for science, culture, literature, translation and humanities.
Order of the Holy Empress Milica (Reverend Nun Evgenija) –  It is awarded for acts of philanthropy.
Order of Saint Simeon the Myrrh-flowing – It is awarded to improve the relationship between church and state. It was once awarded by the Bishop of Šumadija, but it became a general church order.
Order of the Holy Emperor Constantine – Awarded for contribution to freedom of religion and human rights.
 Order of Saint John Vladimir

Diocesan decorations

Archbishopric of Montenegro and the Littoral 

 Golden figure of St. Peter the Second Lovćenski Tajnovidac (unbearable recognition)

Metropolitanate of Dabar-Bosnia 

 Order of Saint Peter

Metropolitanate of Zagreb-Ljubliana 

 Order of Cantacuzino Katarina Branković

Diocese of Banat 

 Order of Saint Teodr of Vršac

Diocese of Budva-Nikšić 

 Jubilee Monument (Đurđevi Stupovi Monastery) - with the image of The holy, glorious and right-victorious Great-martyr and Trophy-bearer George

Eparchy of Valjevo 

 Order of Saint Nicholas of Serbia (Diocese of Valjevo)

Diocese of Vranje 

 Order of the Venerable Prohor Pčinjski

Diocese of Upper Karlovac 

 Order of the Holy Martyrs of Karlovac

Diocese of Dalmatia 

 Order of Dr. Nikodim Milas

Diocese of Žiča 

 Order of Saint Simeon the Monk - established by Bishop of Žička by Stefan the First-Crowned

Diocese of Zvornik-Tuzla 

 Order of the Holy King Dragutin – Venerable Theoctist

Eparchy of Mileševo 

 Order of the White Angel

Diocese of Nis 

 Order of Saint Constantine
 Order of Saint Roman

Diocese of Osijek-Polje and Baranja 

 Order of the Holy Prince Stefan Štiljanović

Diocese of Raška and Prizren 

 Order of the Holy Prince Lazar
 Mother Jugović Medal

Diocese of Srem 

 Order of Prince Daniel the First
 Order of Saint Arsenije Sremec
 Order of Saint Maxim Branković

Diocese of Šabac 

 Order of Saint Nicholas of Serbia

Diocese of Šumadija 

 Order of Crusader Karađorđe

Orthodox Theological Faculty of St. Vasilije Ostroški in Foča 

 Medal of Saint Vasilije Ostroški

Former decorations 
Order of Saint Simeon the Myrrh-flowing was once awarded by Bishop of Šumadija, but it has been translated into general church decorations.

Until the separation of  Diocese of Šabac and Valjevo, the Diocese of Šabac and Valjevo awarded the Order of St. Nicholas of Serbia. After the separation of the two dioceses, both continued to award this order, with the same name but a different stylistic solution.

References 

Serbian Orthodox Church
Orders, decorations, and medals of the Kingdom of Yugoslavia
Orders, decorations, and medals of the Kingdom of Serbia
Orders of chivalry of Serbia
Saint Sava
Eastern Orthodox ecclesiastical decorations